Sternostoma is a genus of mites in the family Rhinonyssidae. There are more than 70 described species in Sternostoma.

Species
These 79 species belong to the genus Sternostoma:

 Sternostoma alexfaini Feider & Mironescu, 1969
 Sternostoma alexmironi Dimov, 2020
 Sternostoma antoni Dimov, 2020
 Sternostoma artami Feider & Mironescu, 1982
 Sternostoma augei Amaral, 1962
 Sternostoma aymarae (Fain, 1964)
 Sternostoma batis Fain, 1957
 Sternostoma boydae Strandtmann, 1951
 Sternostoma bruxellarum Fain, 1961
 Sternostoma chakarovae Dimov, 2020
 Sternostoma christinae Guevara-Benitez, Lopez-Roman & Ubeda-Ontiveros, 1974
 Sternostoma cisticolae Fain, 1957
 Sternostoma clementei Amaral, 1968
 Sternostoma colii Fain, 1956
 Sternostoma constricta Feider & Mironescu, 1982
 Sternostoma cooremani halcyoni Fain & Nadchatram, 1962
 Sternostoma cordiscutata Feider & Mironescu, 1982
 Sternostoma crotophagae Pence & Casto, 1975
 Sternostoma cryptorhynchum Berlese & Trouessart, 1889
 Sternostoma cuculorum korolevae Bregetova & Slavoshevskaya, 1983
 Sternostoma darlingi Spicer, 1984
 Sternostoma delianovae Dimov, 2020
 Sternostoma dumetellae Pence, 1972
 Sternostoma dureni Fain, 1956
 Sternostoma enevi Dimov, 2020
 Sternostoma epistomata Feider & Mironescu, 1973
 Sternostoma eurocephali Fain, 1960
 Sternostoma ficedulae Fain & Sixl, 1971
 Sternostoma francolini Fain, 1960
 Sternostoma fulicae Fain & Bafort, 1963
 Sternostoma furmani Strandtmann, 1960
 Sternostoma gallowayi Knee, 2018
 Sternostoma giganteum Fain, 1962
 Sternostoma gliciphilae Domrow, 1966
 Sternostoma graculi (Butenko, 1999)
 Sternostoma guevarai Guevara-Benitez, Ubeda-Ontiveros & Cutillas-Barrios, 1979
 Sternostoma hedonophilum Fain & Aitken, 1970
 Sternostoma hirundinis Fain, 1956
 Sternostoma hirundo Fain, Herin & Puylaert, 1977
 Sternostoma hutsoni Furman, 1957
 Sternostoma hylandi Fain & Johnston, 1966
 Sternostoma inflatum Fain, 1963
 Sternostoma isabelae Ubuda-Ontiveros & Guevara-Benitez, 1980
 Sternostoma kelloggi Hyland & Clark, 1959
 Sternostoma kodrensis Shumilo & Lunkashu, 1970
 Sternostoma lagonostictae Fain, 1956
 Sternostoma longisetosae Hyland, 1961
 Sternostoma loxiae Fain, 1965
 Sternostoma marchae Dimov, 2012
 Sternostoma mortelmansi Fain & Bastin, 1959
 Sternostoma nectarinia Fain, 1956
 Sternostoma neosittae Domrow, 1967
 Sternostoma numerovi (Butenko, 1999)
 Sternostoma opistaspis Feider & Mironescu, 1982
 Sternostoma paddae Fain, 1958
 Sternostoma pastor Fain, 1967
 Sternostoma pencei Spicer, 1984
 Sternostoma piprae (Fain & Aitken, 1967)
 Sternostoma pirangae Pence, 1973
 Sternostoma porteri Hyland, 1963
 Sternostoma quiscali Fain & Aitken, 1967
 Sternostoma sayornis Pence & Casto, 1975
 Sternostoma schiffornis Fain & Aitken, 1970
 Sternostoma setifer Knee, 2008
 Sternostoma sialiphilus Hyland & Ford, 1960
 Sternostoma sinense Fain & Bafort, 1963
 Sternostoma sternahirundo Butenko, 1974
 Sternostoma straeleni Fain, 1958
 Sternostoma strandtmanni Furman, 1957
 Sternostoma strigitis Butenko, 1976
 Sternostoma sturnicola Fain, 1956
 Sternostoma tangarae Fain & Aitken, 1967
 Sternostoma technaui (Vitzthum, 1935)
 Sternostoma thienponti Fain, 1956
 Sternostoma tracheacolum Lawrence, 1948
 Sternostoma tyrannus Brooks & Strandtmann, 1960
 Sternostoma ubedai Ubeda-Ontiveros & Guevara-Benitez, 1981
 Sternostoma ziegleri Feider & Mironescu, 1982
 Sternostoma zini Dimov & Knee, 2012

References

Rhinonyssidae
Articles created by Qbugbot